Mexicana Universal San Luis Potosí is a pageant in San Luis Potosí, Mexico, that selects that state's representative for the national Mexicana Universal pageant.

In 2003 and 2005 was not sent to a State Representative.

The State Organization hasn't had a national winner in Nuestra Belleza México.

Titleholders
Below are the names of the annual titleholders of Mexicana Universal San Luis Potosí, listed in ascending order, and their final placements in the Mexicana Universal after their participation, until 2017 the names are as Nuestra Belleza San Luis Potosí.

 Competed in Miss Universe.
 Competed in Miss International.
 Competed in Miss Charm International.
 Competed in Miss Continente Americano.
 Competed in Reina Hispanoamericana.
 Competed in Miss Orb International.
 Competed in Nuestra Latinoamericana Universal.

Designated contestants
As of 2000, isn't uncommon for some States to have more than one delegate competing simultaneously in the national pageant. The following Nuestra Belleza San Luis Potosí contestants were invited to compete in Nuestra Belleza México.

References

External links
Official Website

Nuestra Belleza México